The Kolan vole, Inez's red-backed vole or Inez's vole (Caryomys inez) is a species of rodent in the family Cricetidae. It is found only in China. Two subspecies have been recognized, Caryomys inez inez from the northern part of its range and Caryomys inez nux from the southern part.

Description
The ears are small and rounded and hardly project from the pelage. The dorsal fur is a uniform dull buffish brown and the underparts are pale buff. The upper surface of hands and feet are brown. The upper surface of the tail is dark brown and the underside is pale brown giving it a bicolour appearance.

Distribution and habitat
The Kolan vole is endemic to China where it is known from the provinces of Shaanxi, Shanxi, Anhui, Sichuan, Gansu, Henan, Ningxia, Hebei and Hubei.

Behaviour
Little is known of the reproduction of this species but it is believed to breed between March and October. Females have four nipples and one that was trapped was found to be carrying two embryos.

Status
The Kolan vole has a wide distribution and is presumed to have a large total population. No specific threats have been identified for this vole and there are several protected areas within its range. Although the population trend is unknown, the International Union for Conservation of Nature has assessed its conservation status as being of "least concern".

References

 Musser, G. G. and M. D. Carleton. 2005. Superfamily Muroidea. pp. 894–1531 in Mammal Species of the World a Taxonomic and Geographic Reference. D. E. Wilson and D. M. Reeder eds. Johns Hopkins University Press, Baltimore.

Caryomys
Rodents of China
Mammals described in 1908
Taxa named by Oldfield Thomas
Taxonomy articles created by Polbot